His Majesty's Passport Office (HMPO) is an agency of the Home Office in the United Kingdom. It provides passports for British nationals worldwide and was formed on 1 April 2006 as the Identity and Passport Service before being renamed HM Passport Office on 13 May 2013.

The General Register Office for England and Wales became a subsidiary of HMPO on 1 April 2008, and produces life event certificates such as birth, death, marriage and civil partnerships.

HMPO's headquarters is co-located with the Home Office at 2 Marsham Street and it has seven regional offices around the UK, in London, Glasgow, Belfast, Peterborough, Liverpool, Newport and Durham as well as an extensive nationwide interview office network as first time adult passport applicants may be required to attend an interview to verify their identity as a fraud prevention measure.

Prior to the Queen’s death on 8 September 2022, the department was known as Her Majesty’s Passport Office and has since been amended to reflect the change of monarch.

History

Until April 1984, the Passport Office had been part of the Foreign and Commonwealth Office. Following the Rayner reviews, the Passport Office was transferred to the Home Office. In 1991, the service became an executive agency as the United Kingdom Passport Agency. The Identity and Passport Service was established on 1 April 2006, following the passing of the Identity Cards Act 2006 which merged the UK Passport Service with the Home Office's Identity Cards programme to form a new executive agency.

In 2007, the ninety British diplomatic missions that issued passports were consolidated into seven regional passport processing centres (RPPCs) based in Düsseldorf, Hong Kong, Madrid, Paris, Pretoria, Washington, D.C. and Wellington with an additional centre in Dublin.

The Identity Documents Act 2010 repealed the Identity Cards Act 2006, and required the cancellation of all identity cards and the destruction of all data held.

On 1 April 2011, responsibility for British passports issued overseas passed from the Foreign and Commonwealth Office to IPS. The printing of passports issued overseas had been done in the UK since August 2011 and the administrative work performed at these RPPCs was repatriated to the UK during the 2013–14 financial year. From April 2014, all British nationals based overseas had to apply for their passports directly to the UK.

The Identity and Passport Service was renamed HM Passport Office on 13 May 2013 in an effort to reflect the agency's departure from its association with the scrapped National Identity Register and ID cards. The government stated in the press release that "The inclusion of 'Her Majesty's' in the title recognises that passports are the property of the Crown, bear the royal coat of arms and are issued under the royal prerogative. This means that the grant of a passport is a privilege, not a right, and may be withdrawn in some circumstances.  

HMPO's executive agency status was removed on 1 October 2014 and it became a division within the Home Office. Its board reports directly to the Home Office's executive management board.

See also 
 Five Nations Passport Group

References

External links 
 

Home Office (United Kingdom)
Defunct executive agencies of the United Kingdom government
British passports
2006 establishments in the United Kingdom
Government agencies established in 2006
Passport offices